Isabel Martin (born 11 March 1999)  is a  1.0 point Australian wheelchair basketball player.  She made her international debut with the Australian women's national wheelchair basketball team (the Gliders) at the Osaka Cup in February 2016. In May 2019, she was part of the Australians Devils U25 team that won silver at the 2019 Women's U25 Wheelchair Basketball World Championship in Suphanburi, Thailand.

She represented Australia at the 2020 Summer Paralympics in Tokyo.

Biography
Isabel Martin was born on 11 March 1999. She became paraplegic when she was eight months old as a result of surgery to remove a benign tumour in her spinal cord. Her parents set up a charity called the Wish to Walk Foundation. Fellow students at Shelford Girls' Grammar in Caulfield, Victoria, where she went to school, sold copies of a children's book, An Awesome Book by Dallas Clayton, to raise money for treatment by Project Walk in California. In spite of her disability, she enjoyed sports, and played soccer and cricket with her younger brother Charlie.

A 1.0 point, Martin played for the Kilsyth Cobras in the Women's National Wheelchair Basketball League in 2016. She made her international debut at the Osaka Cup in February 2016. The Gliders came third in the series against Japan, Great Britain and Germany. She was the youngest player on the team. She was named to the Osaka Cup team again in January 2017. She was also named to the U18 Victorian side for the Kevin Coombs Cup in April 2017, and the U23 side in 2019. In May 2019, she was part of the Australians U25 team (the Devils) that won silver at the 2019 Women's U25 Wheelchair Basketball World Championship in Suphanburi, Thailand.

At the 2020 Tokyo Paralympics, the Gliders finished ninth after winning the 9th-10th classification match.

She was Basketball Victoria's Wheelchair Athlete of the Year for 2020.

References

Australian women's wheelchair basketball players
Wheelchair basketball players at the 2020 Summer Paralympics
Living people
People with paraplegia
Sportswomen from Victoria (Australia)
1999 births
Sportspeople from Melbourne